Nicholas Garai may refer to:

 Nicholas I Garai (c. 1325–1386), Palatine of Hungary
 Nicholas II Garai (1367–1433), Palatine of Hungary